Thorne is a British crime drama television series, based on the novels of author Mark Billingham, that was first broadcast on Sky One on 10 October 2010. A single six-episode series, starring David Morrissey in the title role of Detective Inspector Tom Thorne, was broadcast at 21:00 on Sundays until 14 November. As well as Morrissey, the series also stars Aidan Gillen, Eddie Marsan, O-T Fagbenle and Lorraine Ashbourne in supporting roles. The series comprises two three-part dramatisations of the first two Thorne novels, Sleepyhead and Scaredycat. Sleepyhead, directed by Stephen Hopkins, previewed in full at the BFI Southbank in London on 4 October 2010, followed by a Q&A session featuring writer Mark Billingham and actors David Morrissey and Eddie Marsan.

Although directly adapted from the novels, there are notable differences in the series, including: Brigstocke's gender has been changed; Dave Holland's ethnicity has been changed; and Phil Hendricks is portrayed as a short, partly tattooed Irishman with a full head of hair, a juxtaposition of the tall, bald, heavily pierced, heavily tattooed Mancunian described in Billingham's novels. In the United States, Encore broadcast all six episodes of the series across two nights. Sleepyhead and Scaredycat aired on 12 and 13 June 2012 respectively. The series is also available as a complete box set from Netflix. All six episodes were released on Region 2 DVD and Blu-ray on 10 January 2011.

Production
Prior to filming, David Morrissey commented on how he became involved with the role: "I was doing a film in New Zealand, on my own, in winter. I really needed a book. I stumbled across a Thorne novel, liked it, and then I looked up Mark online and found a question-and-answer session where he said that if his books ever made it to the screen, he’d like me to play the lead. I thought, that’s a good start". The first two novels adapted for the series were Sleepyhead, in which Thorne has to track down and stop a serial killer who aims to leave his victims alive but unable to communicate because of locked-in syndrome; and Scaredy Cat, in which two serial killers, Martin Palmer and Stuart Nicklin, begin to work in tandem to pick off their victims.

Billingham later expressed a desire to film all ten Thorne novels. Likewise, Morrissey confirmed in February 2011 that a second series had gone into production. However, in a newsletter issued to members of his mailing list in December 2012, Billingham stated that Morrissey's role in The Walking Dead had suspended plans for any further series. To date, no further series of Thorne have been produced.

Reception
The series primarily faced competition from  Downton Abbey, Single Father and a re-run of The Da Vinci Code on its debut broadcast, although held a 1.5% audience share, drawing in 402,000 viewers, according to BARB. Likewise, reviews of the series have been positive, and it holds a score of 74/100 on review aggregation website Metacritic. Tom Sutcliffe of The Independent wrote approvingly of the direction of director Stephen Hopkins, "who keeps using his camera to catch Thorne from incriminating angles, as if he's a perpetrator not a policeman", and the performances of Morrissey and McElhone.

Andrea Mullaney of The Scotsman, praised the efforts made by BSkyB in the production and casting, but added "it's a shame that our best actors can't be used for anything more radical or real." Adam Sweeting of The Arts Desk wrote a more scathing review, commenting; "Despite the hype, it's just another cop show full of corpses, but Morrissey feels authentic as the phlegmatic, low-key Thorne". He also criticised the romantic link between Morrissey and McElhone, writing; "It was like Vinnie Jones getting off with Joanna Lumley".

Cast
 David Morrissey as DI Tom Thorne
 Eddie Marsan as Kevin Tughan
 Aidan Gillen as Phil Hendricks
 O-T Fagbenle as Dave Holland
 Lorraine Ashbourne as Ruth Brigstocke
 Jack Shepherd as Jim Thorne

Sleepyhead
 Natascha McElhone as Anne Coburn
 Sara Lloyd-Gregory as Alison Willetts
 Aisling Loftus as Rachel Coburn
 Sarah Niles as Maggie Byrne
 Joshua Close as Josh Ramsey
 Brian McCardie as Francis Calvert
 Stephen Campbell Moore as Jeremy Bishop 
 Georgia Tennant as Sophie Holland 
 Amanda Root as Teresa Maxwell

Scaredy Cat
 Sandra Oh as DS Sarah Chen
 Tom Brooke as Martin Palmer
 Joe Absolom as Stuart Nicklin
 Claire Benedict as Maeve Reynolds
 Lolita Chakrabarti as Seema Khera
 Leo Gregory as Sean Bracher
 Javed Khan as DC Dev Khan
 Velibor Topic as Pavel Rasadovic
 Harry Jarvis as Young Stuart Nicklin

Episodes

References

External links
 Thorne page at Sky website
 Liz Hoggard, 4 October 2010, Hit men: 24 director and David Morrissey team up for new crime show Thorne, Evening Standard
 http://filmlondon.org.uk/news/2010/october/serial_life_in_east_london
 
 

2010 British television series debuts
2010 British television series endings
2010s British crime drama television series
2010s British police procedural television series
2010s British television miniseries
English-language television shows
Sky UK original programming
Television shows based on British novels